Radovan Vujanović (born 18 February 1982) is an Austrian-Serbian former professional footballer who played as a forward.

Career
Vujanović was born in Aranđelovac, then Yugoslavia. He began his football career at his home town club FK Šumadija Aranđelovac before moving to Vienna. There he played for the amateur team of Rapid Wien, then Favoritner AC and DSV Fortuna 05, before he joined Austria Wien in January 2004, playing 14 matches in the third-tier Regionalliga Ost. His 19 goals for the club aroused interest from German third-tier side SC Paderborn who signed Vujanović in January 2005.

With his new club he won promotion to the 2. Bundesliga and played four matches in Germany's professional second-tier league before joining Regionalliga Süd side SV Wehen in January 2006. Despite scoring three goals in eleven matches, Vujanović moved on in the summer 2006, joining Kickers Emden in the Regionalliga Nord. After initial difficulties he established himself as a regular, scoring 22 goals in 60 matches.

After his Emden contract ran out, Vujanović joined 1. FC Magdeburg at the beginning of the 2007–08 season. He became a first team regular and was the only player to appear in all 34 matches in that season, also becoming the club's top scorer with 20 goals. For the 2009–10 season, Vujanović was made captain. When Magdeburg missed out on promotion to the 3. Liga, Vujanović dissolved his contract and joined Hansa Rostock for the 2010–11 season. He signed for Preußen Münster on loan in August 2011.

References

External links
 

Living people
1982 births
People from Aranđelovac
Austrian people of Serbian descent
Austrian footballers
Serbian footballers
Association football forwards
2. Liga (Austria) players
3. Liga players
Regionalliga players
Favoritner AC players
SC Paderborn 07 players
SV Wehen Wiesbaden players
Kickers Emden players
1. FC Magdeburg players
FC Hansa Rostock players
SC Preußen Münster players
LASK players
SV Horn players
Expatriate footballers in Germany